John Bryce Syphax (1838–1916) was an African-American politician during the Reconstruction era. Born free in Virginia, he served as a justice of the peace of the Arlington Magisterial Board. In 1872 he was elected to the Virginia House of Delegates, serving through 1875. Later in life he moved to New York City, where he settled in Brooklyn.

Life
Syphax was a son of Charles Syphax and Maria Carter Syphax. She was the natural daughter of an enslaved woman, Ariana Carter, and white planter George Washington Parke Custis. He was the only grandson of First Lady Martha Washington, by her first marriage. Custis permitted his mixed-race daughter and her chosen spouse, Charles Syphax, to marry at his mansion of Arlington in 1821.

In addition, Custis arranged in 1826 for Maria Syphax and her (then) two children to be freed by selling them to a Quaker apothecary. Because children's status was determined by that of the mother, this ensured that the remainder of the Syphax children were born free. In addition, he granted Maria 17 acres at his Arlington estate, where she and her family could live. She stayed there for the remainder of her life.

Among Syphax's siblings was his older brother William Syphax, who became active in Washington, DC, working for the Department of Interior and later on the school board for black schools.

John Syphax became active in politics after the Civil War. He was appointed as a justice of the peace of the Arlington Magisterial Board. Later, in 1872, he was elected to the Virginia Assembly, serving into 1875.

In the late 19th century, Syphax migrated north to New York. He died in Brooklyn, New York on September 8, 1916, and was buried in Cypress Hill Cemetery in that city.

See also
 African-American officeholders during and following the Reconstruction era

References

Politicians from Virginia Beach, Virginia
1838 births
1916 deaths